Emmanuel Presbyterian Church may refer to:

Emmanuel Presbyterian Church (Colorado Springs, Colorado), listed on the NRHP in Colorado
Emmanuel Presbyterian Church (Rochester, New York), listed on the NRHP in New York
Emmanuel Presbyterian Church (Whippany, New Jersey)
Emmanuel Orthodox Presbyterian Church, (Wilmington, Delaware)